Royal Palm Hotel has been the name of several hotels, including:
Royal Palm Hotel (Miami), an early 20th-century luxury hotel
Royal Palm Hotel (Detroit, Michigan), a Registered Historic Place 
Royal Palm Hotel (Havana)